The Fourth International (identified here by its major theoretical magazine "La Verite")  was established as an "International Centre (or Center) of Reconstruction" by co-thinkers of Pierre Lambert, in 1981 who argued that the post-war political evolution of the Fourth International under the leadership of Michel Pablo and Ernest Mandel had taken the FI away from the ideas of its founder, Leon Trotsky. In the opinion of Lambert and his co-thinkers, the FI needed to be reconstructed. In 1993, they formed a new International, which they describe as the Fourth International. 

The Fourth International's (La Verite) roots lie in the Organising Committee for the Reconstruction of the Fourth International (OCRFI), which was established in 1972. It formed a short-lived bloc with Nahuel Moreno's tendency. A Parity Committee which operated in 1979 1980 produced Forty Theses of agreements between the tendencies led by Moreno and Lambert. On that basis, the Fourth International (International Committee) (FI[IC]) was founded in 1980. However, the convergence decelerated because of Lambert's support for the government of Socialist Party (France) and French Communist Party without capitalist ministers, a traditional position of French Trotskyism going back before the death of Trotsky. Moreno's supporters boycotted a General Council of the FI(IC) in the Autumn of 1981 whereupon Lambert declared a split: Moreno's supporters formed the International Workers League; at a meeting on 21–23 December 1981 Lambert's supporters formed the "Fourth International - International Centre of Reconstruction", or ICR.

The ICR underwent a period of re-orientation, during which Lambert proposed that the ICR should announce itself as the Fourth International. In 1986-87 Brazilian member Luis Favre became critical of Pierre Lambert within the PCI/OCRFI, but Lambert's position was adopted.

In June 1993, a world conference of 44 sections of the ICR was held in Paris. It re-proclaimed the Fourth International on the basis of one of its founding document: the Transitional Program. The resulting international organization, linked closely with the International Liaison Committee for a Workers' International, is known among its adherents and national sections simply as the Fourth International.  Since it is not the only group to refer to itself in this way, others refer to it as the "Lambertist" Fourth International (after Pierre Lambert, one of its most prominent members), as the Fourth International (La Vérité) (after its international theoretical journal La Vérité), or as SIQI (for the French Secrétariat International de la Quatrième Internationale (International Secretariat of the Fourth International), the name of its leading body).

Countries where the reproclaimed Fourth International has sections or groups of supporters

[Notes: as of February 2010]
 Algeria—Socialist Workers Organization works inside the larger mass-based Workers Party
 Bangladesh—Democratic Workers Party (works as a tendency within it)
 Belgium—International Socialist Organisation (OSI)
 Benin—Benin Section of the Fourth International
 Bolivia—The Spark
 Brazil—The Work
 Britain—British Section of the Fourth International works inside the British  Labour Party
 Burundi—Workers Political Circle
 Chad—Chad Section of the Fourth International
 Chile—Socialist Workers Organization
 China—Chinese supporters of the Fourth International
 Corte d'Ivoire—Corte d'Ivoire Section of the Fourth International
 Croatia—Section of the Fourth International in ex-Yugoslavia
 Dominican Republic—Dominican Supporters of the Fourth International
 Ecuador—Socialist Workers Organization
 France—Internationalist Communist Current (works inside the larger Independent Workers Party)
 Gabon—Gabon supporters of the  Fourth International
 Germany—Internationalistische Sozialistische Arbeiterorganisation (now works inside Social Democracy).
 Greece—Greek Section of the Fourth International
 Guadeloupe—Guadeloupe Section of the Fourth International
 Haiti—Socialist Workers Party of Haiti (works inside the larger Parti Oeuvre Socialist)
 Italy—Italian supporters of the Fourth International
 India—Indians supporters of the FI (Kolkata and Mumbai)
 Korea—Korean supporters of the Fourth International
 Martinique—supporters of the Fourth International
 Mexico—Socialist Workers Organization
 Nicaragua—Trotskyist Circle of Nicaragua
 Palestine—Section of the Fourth International
 Peru—Peruvian Section of the Fourth International (Works inside the broader Partido Trabajodores del Campo y Ciudad)
 Portugal—Internationalist Socialist Party
 Romania—Workers Politics
 Russia—Russian Section of the Fourth International
 Rwanda—Workers Political Circle
 Senegal—Socialist Workers Organization
 Serbia—Section of the Fourth International in ex-Yugoslavia
 South Africa/Azania—Azanian Section of the Fourth International works and leads the larger Socialist Party of Azania
 Spain—Internationalist Socialist Workers' Party
 Sweden—Swedish Supporter of the Fourth International
 Switzerland—Union of Workers Political Circles
 Togo—Togo Section of the Fourth International
 Tunisia—supporters of the Fourth International
 Turkey—Revolutionary Workers League
 Ukraine—Ukraine Section of the Fourth International
 Uruguay—Section of the Fourth International in Uruguay
 United States—Socialist Organizer
 Venezuela—Venezuelan Section of the Fourth International

See also
List of Trotskyist internationals

References

External links
The Manifesto of the Fourth World Congress of the Fourth International (1999).
The Fourth International and the United Front (Excerpts from a report by Pierre Lambert presented to the Fifth World Congress of the Fourth International, Berlin, 2002).

Members
International Socialist Organization, OSI-SIO (Belgium)
Parti Ouvrier Indépendant (France)
Organización Socialista de Trabajadores (Mexico)
Corrente O Trabalho do Partido dos Trabalhdores (Brazil)
Unofficial site concerning the Parti des Travailleurs (Algeria)
Partido Obrero Socialista Internacionalista (Spain)
Tribuna Socială (Romania)
L’Union des Cercles pour une Politique Ouvrière (Switzerland)
України "Боротьба" (Ukraine)